The 2022 Rhode Island gubernatorial election was held on November 8, 2022, to elect the governor of Rhode Island. Incumbent Democratic Governor Dan McKee became Rhode Island's governor on March 2, 2021, when term-limited Gina Raimondo resigned following her confirmation as United States Secretary of Commerce. McKee easily won a full term on election day, defeating Republican Ashley Kalus by more than 19 percentage points.

McKee's margin of victory and vote share were the highest for any candidate for governor of Rhode Island since 1992.

Democratic primary

Candidates

Nominee 

 Dan McKee, incumbent governor

Eliminated in primary
Matt Brown, former Rhode Island secretary of state, candidate for the U.S. Senate in 2006 and candidate for governor in 2018 
Helena Foulkes, former CVS executive, granddaughter of former U.S. Senator Thomas Dodd and niece of former U.S. Senator Chris Dodd (endorsed McKee)
Nellie Gorbea, Rhode Island secretary of state
Luis Daniel Muñoz, physician, community organizer, and independent candidate for governor in 2018

Withdrew
Seth Magaziner, Rhode Island general treasurer (running for the U.S. House)

Declined
Jorge Elorza, mayor of Providence
James Langevin, U.S. representative for Rhode Island's 2nd congressional district and former secretary of state of Rhode Island
Peter Neronha, attorney general of Rhode Island (running for re-election)

Endorsements

Polling
Graphical summary

Results

Republican primary

Candidates

Nominee 
 Ashley Kalus, businesswoman and former director of public engagement for Illinois governor Bruce Rauner

Eliminated in primary
Jonathan Riccitelli, Independent candidate for Lieutenant Governor in 2018

Declined
Ken Block, businessman, Moderate Party nominee for governor in 2010, and Republican candidate for governor in 2014
David Darlington, former chair of the Rhode Island Turnpike and Bridge Authority
Jessica de la Cruz, minority whip of the Rhode Island Senate (ran for U.S. House)
Blake Filippi, minority leader of the Rhode Island House of Representatives (running for re-election)
Allan Fung, former mayor of Cranston and nominee for governor of Rhode Island in 2014 and 2018 (running for U.S. House)

Endorsements

Results

Third parties and Independents

Qualified
Elijah Gizzarelli (Libertarian)
Zachary Hurwitz (Independent)
Paul Rianna Jr (Independent), nursing assistant at Fatima Hospital

Declined 
Bill Gilbert (Moderate Party), Moderate Party nominee for Governor in 2018 and for Lieutenant Governor in 2014 (running for U.S. House)

General election

Predictions

Endorsements

Polling 

Dan McKee vs. Jonathan Riccitelli

Debates

Results

Note

Partisan clients

References

External links 
Official campaign websites
 Matt Brown (D) for Governor
 Helena Foulkes (D) for Governor
 Nellie Gorbea (D) for Governor
 Rey Alberto Hererra (R) for Governor
 Dan McKee (D) for Governor
 Luis Daniel Muñoz (D) for Governor
  Ashley Kalus (R) for Governor
 Paul Rianna Jr (I) for Governor

2022
Rhode Island
Governor